Soliva is a genus of South American plants in the sunflower family. Burrweed is a common name for some species in this genus.

Species
 Soliva anthemidifolia (Juss.) Sweet - Colombia
 Soliva anthemifolia (Juss.) Sweet - Ecuador, Brazil, Paraguay, Uruguay
 Soliva macrocephala Cabrera - Uruguay, northern Argentina
 Soliva sessilis Ruiz & Pav. - Brazil, Paraguay, Uruguay, northern Argentina, Chile
 Soliva stolonifera (Brot.) R.Br. ex Sweet - Peru, Bolivia, Uruguay
 Soliva triniifolia Griseb. - Argentina

References

Anthemideae
Asteraceae genera
Flora of South America